The 2005 IIHF European Champions Cup was the first edition of IIHF European Champions Cup. It was held in Saint Petersburg at the Ice Palace arena, from January 13 to January 16. The champions of 2004 of the six strongest hockey nations of Europe participate: Avangard Omsk (RUS), HV71 (SWE), HC Dukla Trenčín (SVK), Kärpät (FIN), HC Hame Zlín (CZE) and Frankfurt Lions (GER).

Group A

Results
All times local (CET/UTC +1)

Standings

Group B

Results
All times local (CET/UTC +1)

Standings

Gold medal game

External links
 Official site

1
1
IIHF European Champions Cup
2005